The Islamic Azad University, Damavand Branch (Persian: دانشگاه آزاد اسلامی، واحد دماوند, Dāneshgāh-e Āzād-e Eslāmi, Vāhed-e Damavand, also known as Azad University of Damavand and as Damavand Azad University) is a campus of Islamic Azad University system in Iran. It was established in 2002 with two major fields. This branch now has 54 fields – majors and more than 12,000 students in bachelor, master and Ph.D. levels, located in the east of Tehran, is a branch of technical and engineering departments in the country.

Academies

 Electronic engineering
 Power engineering
 Industrial engineering (System Analysis & Techniques)
 Mechanical engineering
 Civil engineering
 Computer engineering
 Agricultural engineering
 Geotechnical engineering
 Architecture
 Information Technology
 Geology
 Environmental Engineering
 Accountancy
 Law
 Management
 Journalism
 Public relations
 Pedagogy
 English Language

See also 
Azad University

External links 
 official website (www.damavandiau.ac.ir)

 4icu Page

Educational institutions established in 2002
damavand|Damavand
Education in Tehran Province
2002 establishments in Iran
Buildings and structures in Tehran Province